Tyll may refer to:

People
 Axel Tyll, German footballer
 Edward Tyll, American comedian and radio personality
 Tyll Necker, German entrepreneur and president of the Bundesverband der Deutschen Industrie
 Tyll, pseudonym of the German lawyer Edgar Jung

Other uses
 Tyll (novel), a 2017 novel by Daniel Kehlmann
 Tyll, a 1928 opera by the German composer Mark Lothar
 Tyll, a 1918 book by the German writer Hans Reimann

See also
 Thil (disambiguation)
 Til (disambiguation)
 Till (disambiguation)